Barm or Borm in Iran may refer to:
 Barm-e Jamal, Fars Province
 Barm-e Shur, Fars Province
 Barm-e Siah, Fars Province
 Barm-e Siah Rudtalkh, Kohgiluyeh and Boyer-Ahmad Province
 Borm, Lorestan
 Barm, Semnan